These are the official results of the Women's 1500 metres event at the 1990 European Championships in Split, Yugoslavia, held at Stadion Poljud on 30 August and 1 September 1990.

Medalists

Results

Final
1 September

Heats
30 August

Heat 1

Heat 2

Participation
According to an unofficial count, 15 athletes from 9 countries participated in the event.

 (1)
 (2)
 (1)
 (3)
 (2)
 (1)
 (1)
 (3)
 (1)

See also
 1988 Women's Olympic 1500 metres (Seoul)
 1991 Women's World Championships 1500 metres (Tokyo)
 1992 Women's Olympic 1500 metres (Barcelona)

References

 Results

1500
1500 metres at the European Athletics Championships
1990 in women's athletics